Michael Pickett is a multiple award-winning Canadian blues and roots singer, guitarist and harmonica player.

Career
Michael Pickett was born in Toronto on September 19, 1950. Pickett commenced his music career as a member of Whiskey Howl, a seminal Canadian blues band, based in Toronto, Ontario.  After the breakup of Whiskey Howl in the early 1970s, Pickett continued his career as the lead singer and harmonica player for blues band Wooden Teeth, of which he was a co-founder.  As of the late 1970s, Pickett developed a career in his own name, with both the Michael Pickett Band and as a solo artist.  Among other awards, he is the recipient of several Maple Blues Awards, honouring his contributions to blues music. Now he plays occasionally and hosts his Concert For Peace event at his home in Crystal Beach, Ontario each September.

Discography

Whiskey Howl
1972 Whiskey Howl (Warner Bros. Records; CD Release 2008, Pacemaker)
1981 Live at The El Mocambo (As The Whiskey Howl Big Band; CD Release 2005, re-release 2009, Solid Gold)

The Michael Pickett Band
1998 Blues Money
2000 Conversation with the Blues

Solo
2003 Solo
2004 Live at Winterfolk

Compilation albums
2006 Saturday Night Blues: 20 Years (CBC)

As sideman
With Bo Diddley
Big Bad Bo (Chess, 1974)

References

External links
  Official website

Canadian blues singers
Canadian blues guitarists
Canadian male guitarists
Blues harmonica players
Living people
Year of birth missing (living people)
Place of birth missing (living people)